In linguistics, mispronunciation is the act of pronouncing a word incorrectly. The matter of what is or is not mispronunciation is a contentious one, and indeed there is some disagreement about the extent to which the term is even meaningful. Languages are pronounced in different ways by different people, depending on such factors as the area they grew up in, their level of education, and their social class. Even within groups of the same area and class, different people can have different ways of pronouncing certain words.

Standards of pronunciation 
All speakers must adhere to some standard of pronunciation in order to be understood by others. But standards vary among groups, and the extent to which any group has authority to claim that their standard is better, or even that they have the right to impose such a standard, is often the main source of contention.

Those who make claims about correct pronunciation often cite dictionaries as their authority, and so at this point a summary of the principles by which pronunciation guides in dictionaries are written may be helpful. We start by discussing two distinct standpoints from which pronunciation standards can be viewed.

Prescription versus description 
Almost every area of linguistics can be treated in either a prescriptive or a descriptive way. Prescription is the formulation of rules explaining how things should be done, while description is the formulation of rules explaining how things actually are done.

Applied to pronunciation, a prescriptive approach involves telling people that this word should be pronounced in this way, that word should be pronounced in that way, and so on. For example, one might say that the word nuclear should be pronounced ['njuːklɪəɹ] or ['nuːklɪəɹ]. Applied to pronunciation, a descriptive approach involves telling people that some people pronounce a word in this way, while others pronounce a word in that way. For example, one might say that the word nuclear is pronounced ['njuːklɪəɹ] by some people, and ['nuːkjələɹ] by some other people. (See nucular)

At its simplest, the prescriptive approach requires less work, since it does not necessarily depend on how words are actually spoken; one could simply write down one's own pronunciation rules, and add a note saying that this is what everyone else should do too. In practice, it is more complicated, since the prescriber will usually add further constraints relating to orthography (the way words are written), etymology (the way words originated), and other factors. On the other hand, the descriptive approach depends on fieldwork in which the differences in pronunciation systems used in day-to-day life among different people are researched and catalogued.

The move from prescription to description 
Before the advent of the modern scientific method, scholars in Europe largely looked to the Ancient Greek philosophers for the ways to do things. Aristotle was still regarded as the foremost authority in many areas of knowledge. His laws of logic were intended as prescriptions for (rather than descriptions of) thought, and a similar ethos was applied to other areas of life. There was a prevailing attitude that the route to knowledge was through studying ancient texts and reasoning about them in a detached way. After the birth of science, careful observations of how things actually worked began to be advocated instead. However, this methodology took a long time to be applied to language.

In England, scholars were unaware of how languages actually developed, and saw the modern tongues as mere corruptions of the old ones. They attempted to remodel English along the lines of Latin, resulting in the invention of such arbitrary rules as the rejection of the split infinitive. However, in the 18th century, William Jones did a detailed comparison of several languages, including Latin, Greek, Sanskrit, and the Germanic languages, and proposed that they may have evolved from a common root language, perhaps extinct. (See Indo-European language.)

This study is often considered to have been the birth of modern linguistics. After that, more attention was paid to detailed comparisons of languages, and many of the mechanisms by which languages evolve were worked out. It became clear that languages have been constantly changing, splitting up, and diverging, ever since language began. Largely as a result of this, in the 20th and 21st centuries, there has been a trend towards acknowledging diversity within languages as a natural consequence of language evolution, and more effort has been put into studying the diversity than in actively trying to reduce it.

However, this is not to say that linguistic uniformity is not without its advantages. If everyone agreed to a single common standard of grammar, vocabulary, orthography, and pronunciation, then communication would be made easier. On the other hand, much diversity would be lost, and the study of linguistics would lose a lot of its subject material. Which is more important is debatable.

Treatment of pronunciation in dictionaries 
Early dictionaries, such as that by Samuel Johnson in England and later Noah Webster in the United States played a large role in making spelling more uniform. When dictionaries began to add pronunciation guides, they played a similar role there. At first, American dictionaries (at least) tended to avoid listing pronunciations that they considered non-standard, and thus they played a prescriptive role (the British tradition is far more descriptive). However, following the general trend in linguistics, American dictionaries are now becoming more descriptive while British dictionaries are becoming less so (with Australian ones remaining in between); this is the case in other respects as well as with pronunciation. For example, the pronunciation of the word nuclear as if it were spelled nucular is one that is frowned upon by some, but the pronunciation is listed in some dictionaries. However, to take this to mean that the pronunciation is considered either "correct" or "incorrect" is to misunderstand the role that these dictionaries are playing. They are simply reporting current usage.

Pronunciation change 
The following are examples of processes by which pronunciation can change, together with explanations of why speakers view certain pronunciations to be "mispronunciations." It should be noticed that both formal and slang English can be mispronounced.

Omission of phonemes 
There are many examples of words whose etymologies show them to have lost phonemes (consonant or vowel sounds) somewhere in their histories. For example, the silent k at the start of many words in the English language was originally pronounced. The word knight derives from the word cniht in Old English. Here, two consonant sounds have been lost: not only the c, but also the h were sounded, the latter being a voiceless fricative. Such changes have been happening throughout history, and few would seriously propose that we should reverse them all and pronounce knight as cniht. However, when the same thing happens in the present day, the simplified forms are widely labelled as "incorrect". For example, the word Antarctic is etymologically derived from the word Arctic ("ARK-tik"), and originally both cs were pronounced in the former word, as in the latter ("ant-ARK-tik"). This is still the usual pronunciation of the word. However, some speakers omit the first c sound from Antarctic, resulting in a pronunciation ("ant-AR-tik"), of which some disapprove.  The word Arctic itself has undergone a similar change, with a corresponding change in spelling; it is not unusual to see the word Artic ("AR-tik") in names of parks and populated areas.

Adaptation to a different language 
The adoption of words and names from one language to another is also a process that has been going on since time immemorial, although it causes problems in that the phonology of the source language is almost certainly going to be different from that in the destination language, and so mutation of the pronunciation is inevitable. This is perhaps even more of a thorny issue than the above examples of change within a language, because of the possibility that speakers of the source language may be upset at what they may see as the mangling of their language.

The issue is particularly complex because there are several different ways in which an originally foreign word can be used within a language, depending on the extent to which it has been integrated, and this extent varies continuously from the word being considered not a true part of the language at all to its being considered so much a part of the language that few who haven't studied linguistics even know that it ever was foreign.

Many words (e.g. the words beef and pocket) entered the English language from the Norman language following the Conquest of 1066. They have been so thoroughly integrated into the language that they are not generally considered to be foreign, and they follow the usual laws of English phonetics perfectly. Their current pronunciations have generally changed from the original ones, but no-one considers them to be mispronunciations, because the words were adopted so long ago.

Other words (e.g. the French word née, meaning "born", and used with maiden names) have been adopted more recently, and are still considered to be foreign, retaining their diacritics and often being written in italics to show their foreign status. However, they are usually pronounced in an English way (e.g. "nay", with a diphthong instead of a single vowel sound), and it is uncommon for these to be labelled as mispronunciations.

Still other words, including proper nouns such as names of people and places, are not only written as foreign words, but often given their native pronunciation too. For example, the French term mange tout (a type of pea) is often pronounced with a nasal vowel. To do otherwise, especially with a proper noun, is often considered a mispronunciation.

It bears noting, however, that this does not apply to pronunciation differences between dialects of the same language.

Mispronunciation terms 
 Spelling pronunciation: Mispronouncing a word according to its infelicitous or ambiguous spelling.
 Aphesis: Dropping the sound at the start of a word.
 Aspiration: The sounding of an "h" sound at the beginning of a word whether needed or not. For example, the "h" in honor (British: honour) is not sounded but in "happy" it is.  As with all pronunciation "rules", conventions regarding the aspirated "H" differ from region to region.  In parts of the US, it is customary to pronounce "herb" without the initial "h" sound, while in the UK, the initial "h" is aspirated.  In "My Fair Lady", Professor Henry Higgins castigates those "down in Soho Square, dropping aitches everywhere."
 Cacoepy, the opposite of orthoepy
 Epenthesis: The addition of one or more sounds to a word, especially to the interior of a word (at the beginning prothesis and at the end paragoge are commonly used). Epenthesis may be divided into two types: excrescence, for the addition of a consonant, and anaptyxis for the addition of a vowel. 
 Metathesis: The reversal of letters within a word, such as "iron" being pronounced as "iorn."
 Shibboleth: Any distinguishing practice which is indicative of one's social or regional origin, usually referring to features of language, and particularly to a word whose pronunciation identifies its speaker as being a member or not a member of a particular group.
 Spoonerism: The (usually) unintentional exchange of letters or syllables between two words or even within a word, often with comic results – especially when the result changes the speaker's intended meaning. The term is named after the 19th century clergyman and academic Rev. William Spooner, who was supposedly prone to this trait. Among the examples attributed to him is “you've tasted two worms” for “you've wasted two terms”.

Automatic detection 

Using computational techniques, such as machine learning, it is possible to automatically detect mispronunciations in recorded speech.

References

See also 
 Pronunciation

Sociolinguistics
Phonetics
Phonology
Error